Jewish apple cake is a dense cake made with apples which originated in Poland, but is now sold mostly in the U.S. state of Pennsylvania. Apples are common in Jewish Ashkenazi cooking and are a part of the traditional food served during the Jewish holiday of Rosh Hashanah (considered to be the Jewish New Year). Jewish apple cake is traditionally made without dairy products, and may, therefore, be eaten with meals containing meat, in accordance with Jewish dietary laws of kashrut, which forbid the mixing of meat and milk products in the same meal.

References

Apple dishes
Ashkenazi Jewish cuisine
Ashkenazi Jewish culture in Pennsylvania
Ashkenazi Jewish culture in Poland
Cakes
Jewish baked goods